Mumtaz Hussain may refer to:
Mumtaz Hussain (cricketer), Indian first-class cricketer
Mumtaz Hussain (solicitor), British-Bangladeshi solicitor
Mumtaz Hussain (filmmaker), American-Pakistani filmmaker